Madabad (also Romanized as Mādābād; also known as Mādāvā) is a village in Razan Rural District, in the Central District of Razan County, Hamadan Province, Iran. At the 2006 census, its population was 118, in 23 families.

References 

Populated places in Razan County